The Michal Mine known by its Czech name Důl Michal in Ostrava-Michálkovice, in the Czech Republic is a museum of mining located in the pit bank of a former coal mine.
The museum is an Anchor point on the European Route of Industrial Heritage. The buildings have been preserved as they looked at the turn of the 20th century; the area was declared a National Cultural Landmark in 1995.

History
Michal Mine was sunk in 1843; it was remodelled in the 1910s to accommodate the change caused by electricity, compressors and rotating converters were put into operation here in 1912. Little was modernised. The mine was closed in 1993.

Museum
The museum displays the above ground areas that a miner would have been familiar with, including the dressing rooms, washrooms, registry, dispatching, and most importantly, the machine room, with its original and unique equipment that had worked from 1912 until 1993, when the mine was permanently closed.

References
Notes

Footnotes

External links

 Official website

Museums in the Czech Republic
Mining museums
European Route of Industrial Heritage Anchor Points